Waituna West is a village and rural community in the Manawatu District and Manawatū-Whanganui region in New Zealand's central North Island.

It is located on State Highway 54.

History

European settlement

English settlers arrived in the late 1880s expecting to see "eternal lush meadows" to farm. They instead encountered endless thick forest, which they cleared over several years with axes and handshaws. The timbers, stump and logs were then burnt. Some of this work was done by cheap labourers on farming cadetships.

A meeting of residents at a stump led to the opening of a school in 1894. The school house was the first public building in the area.

By about 1895, the farming community had its own rugby team.

Around this time, a ridge was also built over the Rangitikei River about this time.

Recent history

The Hare family, an original English settler family who arrived in Waituna West from Norfolk in the 1880s, was still farming in the area in 2023. The family remained on one farm, Tuatahi, from 1894 to 2017.

Another farm, which has been in the same family since the 1920s, has panoramic views of Mt Ruapehu, Mt Taranaki, and Kapiti Island. Tourists often enter the farm to play with newborn lambs, pitch a tent or play golf.

Facilities

Waituna West Cemetery, a small cemetery for burials and ash interments, is located in the village. The first recorded burial was in January 1901.

The village also has a community hall, built in 1909. The community raised funds in 1996 to move the hall from the main highway to the school for traffic and pedestrian safety. The present hall has an unsealed carpark, and can accommodate up to 180 people.

Education

The school was formed in 1894. Over the years, Tapuae, Pakihikura, Rewa and Dunolly schools were merged into Waituna West School.

The school celebrated its 125th jubilee in 2019 with a three-day event, including a barbeque, tree plantings, netball and soccer games, a church service, and a picnic lunch.

The village also has a Playcentre early childhood centre.

References

Populated places in Manawatū-Whanganui
Manawatu District